Bolobo Territory is an administrative region of Mai-Ndombe Province of the Democratic Republic of the Congo. The headquarters is the town of Bolobo.
The territory lies on the east side of the Congo River, opposite the Republic of the Congo.

References

Territories of Mai-Ndombe Province

fr:Bolobo